Donje Jabukovo is a village in the municipality of Vladičin Han, Serbia. At the 2002 census, the village had a population of 152.

References

Populated places in Pčinja District